Treaty of Constantinople or Treaty of Istanbul may refer to the following treaties signed in Constantinople (modern Istanbul, Turkey):

 Rus'–Byzantine Treaty (907), signed in Constantinople, ended the Rus'–Byzantine War (907)
 Rus'–Byzantine Treaty (911), signed in Constantinople
 Rus'–Byzantine Treaty (945), signed in Constantinople, ended the Rus'–Byzantine War (941)
 Byzantine–Venetian Treaty of 1082, signed in Constantinople, as a trade and defense pact
 Nicaean–Venetian Treaty of 1219, signed in Constantinople, as a trade and defense pact
 Treaty of Constantinople (1454), between the Ottoman Empire and the Republic of Venice
 Treaty of Constantinople (1479), between the Ottoman Empire and the Republic of Venice, ended the Ottoman–Venetian War (1463–1479)
 Treaty of Constantinople (1533), between the Ottoman Empire and the Archduchy of Austria, as a result of the Battle of Mohacs
 Treaty of Constantinople (1562), between the Ottoman Empire and the Holy Roman Empire
 Treaty of Constantinople (1570), between the Ottoman Empire and the Tsardom of Russia
 Treaty of Constantinople (1590), between the Ottoman Empire and Safavid Persia, ended the Ottoman–Safavid War (1578–1590)
 Treaty of Constantinople (1700), between the Ottoman Empire and Russia, ended the Russo-Turkish War (1686–1700)
 Treaty of Constantinople (1724), between the Ottoman Empire and Russia, dividing large parts of Persia amongst themselves
 Treaty of Constantinople (1736), between the Ottoman Empire and Afsharid Persia, ending the Afsharid-Ottoman War (1730–1735)
 , between the Ottoman Empire and Spain
 Treaty of Constantinople (1800), approval of the 1st Constitution of the Septinsular Republic (as a tributary state to the Ottoman Empire) by the Ottoman Sultan
 Treaty of Constantinople (1832), between the Ottoman Empire and the Great Powers (Britain, France and Russia)
 Treaty of Constantinople (1881), between the Ottoman Empire and the Kingdom of Greece
 Convention of Constantinople, treaty signed in 1888, relating to the control of the Suez Canal
 Treaty of Constantinople (1897), between the Ottoman Empire and the Kingdom of Greece, ending the Greco-Turkish War (1897)
 Treaty of Constantinople (1913), between the Ottoman Empire and Bulgaria, after the Second Balkan War
 Treaty of Constantinople (1914), between the Ottoman Empire and Serbia

See also

 List of treaties
 List of Byzantine treaties
 List of treaties of the Ottoman Empire
 List of treaties of Turkey
 Constantinople Agreement, a WWI agreement to apportion Constantinople and the Dardanelles to Russia
 Istanbul Convention on Temporary Entry, 1990 (WTO goods trade)
 Istanbul Protocol, 1999 (torture)
 Istanbul Convention, 2011, on violence against women and domestic violence
 
 
 
 
 Treaty (disambiguation)
 Istanbul (disambiguation)
 Constantinople (disambiguation)